Liceo Manuel de Salas is a Chilean high school located in Santiago, Cachapoal Province, Chile. It was established in 20 April 1932.

References 

Secondary schools in Chile
Schools in Cachapoal Province
1932 establishments in Chile
Educational institutions established in 1932